A Catalogue of Books Printed in the Fifteenth Century now in the Bodleian Library (cited as Bod-inc.) is a short-title catalogue of more than 5,600 incunabula held in the Bodleian Library at the University of Oxford. Bod-inc. stands out among incunabula catalogues for its detailed listing of the contents of each edition being described. It was published on 7 July 2005 by Oxford University Press in six volumes.

History
L. A. Sheppard began work on a catalogue of Bodleian incunabula in 1955 but he left Oxford in 1971 before the work could be completed; his slip catalogue was bound into seven volumes and served as a base of information for the Bod-inc. project. In the mid-1980s, Kristian Jensen, as the Bodleian Library's specialist in early printed books, decided that a new catalogue was needed and that its descriptions should follow the standards of detail expected in catalogues of medieval manuscripts. Early in the project, Jensen was assisted by Bettina Wagner and Alan Coates beginning in 1992. Work on Bod-inc. was undertaken over the thirteen-year period between January 1992 and January 2005 by a team of cataloguers. From 1992 to 1999, Jensen headed the cataloguing team; he was succeeded by Alan Coates who headed the project from 2000 to its completion, during which time Jensen served as a consultant. Bod-inc. was published in the 400th anniversary year of the publication of the first catalogue of the Bodleian Library in 1605.

Aims of the catalogue
The aims of Bod-inc. are summarized in the catalogue's introduction:

Contents

Bod-inc. is divided into six volumes:

Volume 1
Dedication to L. A. Sheppard
Preface by Reginald Carr
List of organizations and individuals who sponsored the cataloguing project
List of members of the cataloguing team
List of academic advisers
Acknowledgements
Bibliographical abbreviations
General abbreviations
"The Bodleian Library and Its Incunabula" by Alan Coates
"Form of the Entries in the Catalogue" by Alan Coates and Kristian Jensen
Descriptions by Nigel F. Palmer of blockbooks and woodcut and metalcut single sheets
Descriptions of incunabula arranged alphabetically by author or title, A

Volume 2
Descriptions of incunabula arranged alphabetically by author or title, B–C

Volume 3
Descriptions of incunabula arranged alphabetically by author or title, D–H

Volume 4
Descriptions of incunabula arranged alphabetically by author or title, I–O

Volume 5
Descriptions of incunabula arranged alphabetically by author or title, P–S

Volume 6
Descriptions of incunabula arranged alphabetically by author or title, T–Z
Inventory by Silke Schaeper of Hebrew incunabula
Indexes
Index of authors, translators, editors, dedicatees
Index of provenances, owners, donors, and other names
Index of printers and publishers
Appendices
Items recorded by Sheppard, but not included in the Catalogue
Items included in ISTC, but excluded from the Catalogue
List of items in Schreiber, Woodcuts from Books of the 15th Century

Reviews

Notes

External links
Bodleian Incunable Catalogue website – directory of links to PDF files of the entire text of Bod-inc. in parts
Bodleian Library Incunable Cataloguing Project website
Library of Congress Catalog Record

2005 non-fiction books
Bodleian Library collection
Oxford University Press reference books
Short title catalogues
Incunabula